Collingwood Dock is a dock on the River Mersey, in England, and part of the Port of Liverpool. It is  situated in the northern dock system in Vauxhall, and is connected to Stanley Dock to the east and Salisbury Dock to the west.

History
The dock was designed by Jesse Hartley, and opened in 1848 along with four other Liverpool docks. The dock was named after Cuthbert Collingwood, 1st Baron Collingwood and was intended to handle relatively small vessels only. The Liverpool Corporation had a berth for its refuse boats in Collingwood Dock for many years. A bascule road bridge spans the passage between Collingwood and Stanley Docks.

Present
Collingwood Dock has been little altered since construction. The dock is part of the Stanley Dock Conservation Area 
and is on the route of the Leeds and Liverpool Canal extension to the Pier Head. 

Collingwood dock is home to the Glaciere Maritime Academy.

References

Sources

External links

 
  Collingwood Dock aerial photo
 Collingwood Dock

Liverpool docks